Abebe (Amharic: አበበ) is a male name of Ethiopian origin. Notable people with the surname include:

Abebe Aregai (1903–1960), Ethiopian Prime Minister from 1957 to 1960
Abebe Bikila (1932–1973), Ethiopian marathon runner and two-time Olympic champion
Abebe Dinkesa (born 1984), Ethiopian long-distance runner
Abebe Fekadu (born 1970), Ethiopian-Australian Paralympic weightlifter
Abebe Gessese (born 1953), Ethiopian Olympic long jumper
Abebe Mekonnen (boxer) (born 1940), Ethiopian Olympic boxer
Abebe Mekonnen (born 1964), Ethiopian former long-distance runner and 1989 Boston Marathon winner
Abebe Wakgira (born 1921), Ethiopian Olympic long-distance runner
Abebe Zerihun (born 1955), Ethiopian Olympic middle-distance runner
Abiye Abebe (1917–1974), Ethiopian politician and son-in-law of Haile Selassie
Addis Abebe (born 1970), Ethiopian former long-distance runner and 10,000 m Olympic medallist
Alemu Abebe, Ethiopian politician during the Derg
Biruk Abebe (born 1969), Ethiopian cyclist
Christopher E. Abebe (1919–2018), Nigerian human resources executive
Daniel Abebe, American lawyer
Medferiashwork Abebe (1925–2009), Empress-consort of Ethiopia
Mekides Abebe (born 2001), Ethiopian athlete, All-Africa Games champions in women's 3000 metres steeplechase (2019)
Moet Abebe (Laura Monyeazo Abebe; born 1989), Nigerian television presenter, video jockey, and actress
Rediet Abebe (born 1991), Ethiopian computer scientist

See also
Abeba (disambiguation)

Amharic-language names